The Gadidae are a family of marine fish, included in the order Gadiformes, known as the cods, codfishes, or true cods.  It contains several commercially important fishes, including the cod, haddock, whiting, and pollock.

Most gadid species are found in temperate waters of the Northern Hemisphere, but several range into subtropical, subarctic, and Arctic oceans, and a single (southern blue whiting) is found in the Southern Hemisphere. They are generally medium-sized fish, and are distinguished by the presence of three dorsal fins on the back and two anal fins on the underside. Most species have barbels on their chins, which they use while browsing on the sea floor. Gadids are carnivorous, feeding on smaller fish and crustaceans.

Gadids are highly prolific, producing several million eggs at each spawning. This contributes to their high population numbers, which, in turn, makes commercial fishing relatively easy.

Concepts differ about the contents of the family Gadidae. The system followed by FishBase includes a dozen genera.  Alternatively, fishes in the current Lotidae (with burbot, cusk) and Phycidae (hakes) have also been included in the Gadidae, as its subfamilies Lotinae and Phycinae.

See also 
Diseases and parasites in cod

References

External links 
 
 

 
Extant Oligocene first appearances
Marine fish families
Taxa named by Constantine Samuel Rafinesque